Victoria Caroline Plaut (born  1974) is a professor of law and social science at the University of California, Berkeley, where she studies the challenges and opportunities of multiculturalism and diversity. Her pioneering work has examined barriers faced by women in computer science, Whites' reactions to multiculturalism, and the myth of colorblindness in organizations. A noted expert on the causes and consequences of implicit bias, she has penned articles for venues such as the New York Times, the Chicago Tribune, and Scientific American;  and served as an amicus curae to the U.S. Supreme Court.

Plaut received her undergraduate degree from Harvard University, her master's in social psychology from the London School of Economics, and her doctorate in social and cultural psychology from Stanford University's Department of Psychology.

References

External links

University of California, Berkeley faculty
Year of birth missing (living people)
1970s births
Living people
Harvard University alumni
Stanford University alumni
Alumni of the London School of Economics